Televisión y Radio de Campeche (TRC) is the state broadcaster of the Mexican state of Campeche, retransmit the programming of Canal 44 de Guadalajara and Canal Once.

TRC operates an AM radio station, XESTRC-AM 920 "Voces Campeche" in Tenabo, as well as TV station XHCCA-TDT channel 4.1 in San Francisco de Campeche. It also holds the concession for XHRTC-FM 89.3, a currently unbuilt FM radio station also in San Francisco de Campeche.

History
The first public broadcaster in Campeche began in the early 1980s during the government of Alfonso Millán Luna, producing local opt-out programming for Televisión de la República Mexicana. When TRM became part of Imevisión in 1985, the broadcaster moved to new facilities and changed its name to COCATEC, becoming officially incorporated on October 31, 1988. In 1989, XETEB signed on as part of a partnership between the state government and the Instituto Mexicano de la Radio, which would last until 2004. In 1997, COCATEC became TRC.

Long plagued by deteriorating equipment, a lack of financial attention and outmoded facilities, TRC has been hard-pressed to meet deadlines related to the digital television transition as well as to change its AM radio station to the FM band. In 2015, the station accomplished both, signing an accord with the SPR to share transmission infrastructure, thereby allowing it to begin digital broadcasts, and receiving a public concession to build a new FM station.

References

Public television in Mexico
Television stations in Campeche